Bnei Dror (lit. Sons of Liberty) is a moshav shitufi in central Israel. Located near Netanya and covering 3,200 dunams, it falls under the jurisdiction of Lev HaSharon Regional Council.

History
The village was founded on 12 May 1946 by demobilised Jewish soldiers from the British Army who had fought in North Africa and Italy during World War II and had first had the idea of establishing a moshav in 1941. Its name symbolises the founders' desire to live a free life.

Residents work in agriculture and factories for furniture, sunglasses and packaging, as well as a shopping centre, regional school and pensioners' home.

References

External links
Village website 

Moshavim
Populated places established in 1946
Jewish villages in Mandatory Palestine
Populated places in Central District (Israel)
1946 establishments in Mandatory Palestine